Logopandecteision is a 1653 parodic book by Sir Thomas Urquhart, detailing his plans for the creation of an artificial language by that name.

Content and purpose 
The book consists of several distinct sections, most notably including a list of the language's “66 unparalleled excellences”; the rest consists of polemics against Urquhart’s creditors, the Church of Scotland, and others whom he claims prevented him from publishing his “perfected language” through neglect and wrongdoings. Where the book deals with the plan of Logopandecteision, it recalls his earlier work Eskybalauron.

It has been claimed that the entire work was intended as a kind of elaborate practical joke. Under the alternate spelling Logopandekteision, extracts are sometimes presented which make it appear that Urquhart seriously undertook the creation of a constructed language.

Language 
The grammar of the language described in the text is somewhat reminiscent of the extensive and intricate taxonomic structures of other philosophical languages, and of the baroque grammar of later projects such as Volapük. Urquhart promises twelve parts of speech: each declinable in eleven cases, four numbers, eleven genders (including god, goddess, man, woman, animal, etc.); and conjugable in eleven tenses, seven moods, and four voices.

Many impossible qualities are claimed, such as that any number of any magnitude could be expressed in this language by a single word, so concisely that the number of sand grains required to “fill Earth and Heaven” would be expressible by just two letters. Urquhart at one point promises: "here is no Language in the world, but for every word thereof, it will afford you another of the same signification, of equal syllables with it, and beginning or ending, or both, with vowels or consonants as it doth"; and that "in translating verses of any vernaculary tongue, such as Italian, French, Spanish, Slavonian, Dutch, Irish, English, or whatever it be, it affords you of the same signification, syllable for syllable, and in the closure of each line a rime, as in the original". Other remarkable assertions include that this language could be used translate any idiom in any other language, without any alteration of the literal sense, but still fully representing the intention.

See also 
 An Essay Towards a Real Character, and a Philosophical Language
 Philosophical language

References

Sources 

 
 
 
 

Engineered languages
1653 books
Scottish non-fiction books
17th century in Scotland
Constructed languages